Anton Cederholm (born February 21, 1995) is a former professional ice hockey defenceman from Sweden. He last played with the Utica Comets of the American Hockey League (AHL) while under contract as a prospect to  the Vancouver Canucks of the National Hockey League (NHL). Cederholm was selected by the Canucks in the 5th round (145th overall) of the 2013 NHL Entry Draft.

Playing career
Cederholm made his Elitserien debut playing with Rögle BK during the 2012–13 Elitserien season.

After the first season of his entry-level contract with the Vancouver Canucks, in which he spent the 2015–16 campaign with ECHL affiliate, the Kalamazoo Wings, Cederholm was loaned back to Rögle BK to further develop for the 2016–17 season on July 25, 2016.

At the conclusion of his entry-level deal with the Canucks, Cederholm was not tendered a qualifying offer by the Canucks and was free to pursue free agency on June 25, 2018.

Career statistics

Regular season and playoffs

International

References

External links

1995 births
Living people
AIK IF players
Kalamazoo Wings (ECHL) players
Portland Winterhawks players
Rögle BK players
Swedish ice hockey defencemen
Utica Comets players
Vancouver Canucks draft picks
Sportspeople from Helsingborg